Kooddoo or Koodoo (Dhivehi: ކޫއްޑޫ އެއަރޕޯޓް) is one of the inhabited islands of Gaafu Alif Atoll, in the Maldives.

It is located on the Northeastern rim of Huvadu Atoll. It holds the Kooddoo Airport. Northern Huvadhu Atoll or Gaafu Alifu is an administrative division created on February 8, 1962, when Huvadhu Atoll was divided into two districts. 
The island holds a canning factory, icing factory, some restaurants, gas station, and it sits on the causeway that links it to Vilingili and Raaverrehaa islands.

Populated places in the Maldives
Islands of the Maldives